is a Japanese anime television series produced by Gainax, as well as a series of tie-in media developed around it. The series ran from October to December 2010 on BS Nittele (a free-to-air satellite service of Nippon Television). In English-speaking areas, the series has been licensed by Funimation (now Crunchyroll) for distribution in North America, and Manga Entertainment for the United Kingdom.

Story

The show revolves around the exploits of the Anarchy sisters, Panty and Stocking, angels who were kicked out of Heaven due to their bad behavior. They are sent to Daten City—a pun on the Japanese word —a place on the border between Heaven and Hell, which is besieged by evil spirits referred to as "Ghosts". The sisters take refuge under the care of the reverend Garterbelt; under his watchful eyes, the sisters are tasked with using their ability to transform their lingerie into weapons, and using them to destroy malicious Ghosts. By doing so, the sisters earn "Heaven Coins" with which they intend to one day buy their way back into Heaven. However, Panty and Stocking are constantly sidetracked by their respective interests in men and sugary sweets.

Development
Following the broadcast of Imaishi's previous project, Gurren Lagann, the show's staff went on a trip for rest and relaxation. At that time, they aired their opinions to each other under drunken and humorous circumstances, saying such things as "Next time, I want to try this" in approaches to animation. Almost all of the concepts for the anime were made during the initial trip; the names of main characters, "Panty" and "Stocking", were coined at the very first meeting. Hiromi Wakabayashi, who provided the initial idea for the series, cited American adult animation, such as Drawn Together, as inspiration for the show's crudeness.

Characters

Protagonists

Panty is a blonde-haired pale-skinned angel whose only interests are looking for men to sleep with and basking in the popularity of being an Anarchy sister. She does not take her Ghost-hunting duties as seriously as her sister Stocking, instead preferring to fulfill her personal goal of having sex with 1,000 men on Earth before returning to Heaven. She has the ability to transform her panties into a pistol called . She occasionally wields a second Backlace using Stocking's panties, doubling her firepower and allowing her to combine them into more advanced firearms such as a submachine gun or sniper rifle. She can weaponize male panties, though the weapon's size and usefulness depends on the size of the original wearer's penis.

Stocking is a pink-and-violet-haired goth angel with pale skin and a gluttonous appetite for sugary foods. While she does not have the same level of interest in sex as her sister, she does show sexual urges and interests and is generally more interested in masochistic activities, such as bondage and electrocution. She owns a stuffed cat doll called , which changes its facial expressions in accordance to Stocking's mood.

The reverend of Daten City. He is the Anarchy sisters' guardian. Garterbelt is a large black man with a massive afro. He relays missions from Heaven to Panty and Stocking, practices bondage, and displays interest in young males, particularly Brief, and uses a masked alias called "Master G" to disguise himself while undertaking such hobbies. He is cursed with immortality and forbidden from dying until he fulfills his given task.

Panty and Stocking's sidekick, a green dog-like creature, actually a restrained Bull Ghost, with zippers on his body, who closely resembles the character GIR from Invader Zim. Chuck is subject to mortal injuries. He can only be immobilized by opening the zippers on his head and releasing his brain, a 2-inch tall male demon who is romantically involved with Fastener's brain. He is used by Heaven as a mailbox of sorts, getting struck by lightning and spitting out a piece of paper containing a clue to a Ghost's whereabouts.

A self-proclaimed ghost hunter with an interest in science fiction and the supernatural, for which he is nicknamed "Geekboy" by Panty and Stocking. Brief tries acting as the voice of reason for the Anarchy sisters but instead becomes the butt of many jokes in the series. He is the blood kin of Hell's Monkey, whose penis becomes the key to the gates of Hell.

Antagonists

The monsters of the week in the series, Ghosts are twisted aberrations born from the regrets or suffering of people who have died and become lost in limbo. Panty and Stocking are tasked with their destruction, which allows them to pass on to Heaven, leaving behind Heaven Coins. Although most Ghosts are savage or destructive, some are relatively harmless annoyances or even oppose their true nature and try to live peacefully. Ghosts are usually slain with angelic weapons, but there are other means of destroying them, such as Ghosts killing each other or peacefully accomplishing what they wanted to achieve in life. As a recurring joke, whenever Panty and Stocking defeat a Ghost with their angelic weapons, a paper-mache model of the Ghost is filmed being blown-up.

The older of the Demon sisters, Corset's minion and Panty's arch rival, who oversee the creation of Ghosts in Daten City while acting as the mayor's daughter in public. Scanty is a demon with red skin and green hair and with her sister Kneesocks comes up with schemes to kill or otherwise humiliate the Anarchy sisters. Scanty wears two pairs of scanties that transform into revolvers called , which she can combine into a shotgun.

The younger of the Demon sisters, Corset's minion and Stocking's arch rival. Kneesocks is a red-skinned demon dressed similarly to her sister but wears glasses and has blue hair worn in a ponytail. Unlike her sister, Kneesocks only has a single horn, on her forehead. She wears two kneesocks that transform into a pair of scythes called .

Scanty and Kneesocks' sidekick, and Chuck's rival. Fastener is a pink rodent-like creature with zippers covering his body. He can only be immobilized by opening the zipper on his head and releasing his brain, a 2-inch tall female demon who is romantically involved with Chuck's brain. He can turn himself inside-out into a Hydra Ghost.

The mayor of Daten City, the superior of Scanty and Kneesocks. Corset is a pale blue-skinned demon with a conical hairstyle who wears various types of BDSM equipment such as buckles, mouth-stretching hooks, and a corset that he frequently tightens to enhance his upper body strength.

Media

Anime

The television series was animated by Gainax and directed by Hiroyuki Imaishi. The series' animation is done in a distinct style resembling and paying homage to American cartoons, along with the Yoshinori Kanada techniques normally associated with Hiroyuki Imaishi's work. The series has many sexual themes in every episode. The theme of the anime is "vulgar and indecent jokes", with Imaishi saying, "If we are going to do this, we will try it thoroughly."

The series ran from October 1 to December 24, 2010 on BS Nittele, a free-to-air satellite service of Nippon Television. It was also shown on AT-X seven days after the premiere of each episode, and made available online on Nico Nico Channel (a service of Niconico) through the series's own channel a day after AT-X broadcast. On terrestrial television, it was syndicated in eight markets, including a few JAITS members like Tokyo MX, and TVQ, a TXN affiliate in Kyushu. Internationally, the series was made available online on Crunchyroll.

The series was released in six DVD and BD volumes respectively over the course of six months, with the first DVD/BD volume released on December 24, 2010, followed by succeeding volumes near the end of each following month. The fifth volume, released on April 28, 2011, includes a disc-exclusive episode (OVA) compiling eight short stories, some of which are sequels/conclusions to earlier episodes of the series.

On April 14, 2011, North American anime distributor Funimation Entertainment announced their license to the series, which was released on DVD on July 10, 2012. The Blu-ray was released January 15, 2013. The English dub is directed by Colleen Clinkenbeard, with John Burgmeier acting as head writer and Jamie Marchi, Leah Clark, and Jared Hedges serving as episode writers. The first two episodes were made available for streaming on May 22, 2012 for those subscribed to Funimation's Elite Video Subscription service.

Manga Entertainment released the series in the United Kingdom on July 30, 2012, although upon release, faults were discovered on some of the episodes. A corrected version was released on September 10, 2012.

On November 25, 2016, the official Twitter account for Gainax West posted an announcement teaser image featuring silhouettes of Panty and Stocking with the words " Soon". An announcement for "something new with Panty & Stocking with Garterbelt" was to be made on December 16, 2016, which Gainax West stated would not be a pachinko, pachislot, social network game or Blu-ray. On December 16, 2016, various Panty & Stocking with Garterbelt projects were announced.

A new project based on the series was announced by Studio Trigger at Anime Expo 2022.

Manga
A manga adaptation of the series by Tagro was serialized in Kadokawa Shoten's Young Ace magazine between August 2010 and June 2011. The series was compiled in a single tankōbon volume, released in Japan on June 4, 2011, and was published in English by Dark Horse Comics on May 28, 2015. Another manga illustrated by Hiroyuki Imaishi was serialised in NewType before moving to Monthly Anime Style magazine. Some strips were included in the Panty & Stocking with Garterbelt: Datencity Paparazzi art book, released on June 4, 2011, but the series has not been published in tankōbon format.

Music

The series' musical score is by TCY Force produced by Taku Takahashi (of M-Flo). The opening theme is "Theme for Panty & Stocking", performed by Hoshina Anniversary. The ending theme is "Fallen Angel", performed by Mitsunori Ikeda and featuring Aimee B. The original soundtrack was released on December 29, 2010. A hidden track is on the CD. The special edition of the volume 4 BD/DVD includes a bonus CD containing television edits of certain songs from the official soundtrack, as well as previously unreleased songs.

A second album, Panty & Stocking with Garterbelt THE WORST ALBUM, was released on 20 July 2011 and features 24 tracks, including remixes of previous songs from the original anime soundtrack, some new songs, as well as "Cherry Corrida" drama tracks.

Reception
In 2011, Panty & Stocking with Garterbelt was part of the Jury Selections of the 15th Japan Media Arts Festival in the Animation category. In 2019, Polygon named Panty & Stocking with Garterbelt as one of the best anime of the 2010s, stating that it "delivered raunchy, stupid humor in a great animation style", and Crunchyroll listed it in their "Top 100 best anime of the 2010s". IGN also listed Panty & Stocking with Garterbelt among the best anime series of the 2010s, describing it as "an irreverent, entertaining joy-ride with dozens of tributes to western cartoons and a bangin' soundtrack".

Panty & Stocking received a polarized reaction from critics. Carl Kimlinger of Anime News Network found the show to be "unremittingly revolting" and "generally not funny".  Anime News Networks individual episode reviews were equally critical, accusing the series more than once of having a style-over-substance approach and generally flawed, tasteless and needlessly disturbing comedy in spite of its impressive production values. Reviewer Gia Manry found the visuals and sounds to be overwhelming and the writing substandard, ending in a 1 out of 5 score. Critic Jacob Chapman considered the show to be a "mess" with a "poisonous air hanging around [it]" and thoroughly unpleasant to sit through.

However, David Brothers of Comics Alliance claims that the series feels like the result of an "unholy union" between The Ren & Stimpy Show and Dirty Pair. He recommends it, saying "it's raunchy, gross, a whole lot of fun" and that "the mix of disparate influences and material makes it a refreshingly funny anime, and dumb in a way where you can clearly see the hand of smart, experienced animators at work behind the scenes." Mike LeChevallier of Japanator says that "where plot structure is hit or miss, the pure stylization, soundtrack and memorable characters make this a series one worth watching from start to finish."

References

External links
 

2010 anime television series debuts
2010 Japanese television series endings
2010 manga
Action anime and manga
Angels in television
Anime with original screenplays
Comedy anime and manga
Funimation
Gainax
Japanese adult animated action television series
Japanese adult animated comedy television series
Kadokawa Shoten manga
Seinen manga
Studio Trigger